Duilian may refer to:

 Duilian (poetry), couplets in Chinese poetry, known in Chinese as duilian
 Duilian (wushu), a dual event in wushu